Keita Masuda (舛田圭太; born 27 February 1979 in Kanazawa, Ishikawa, Japan) is a male badminton player from Japan.

Career
Masuda competed in badminton at the 2004 Summer Olympics in men's doubles with partner Tadashi Ohtsuka.  They had a bye in the first round, then were defeated in the round of 16 by Fu Haifeng and Cai Yun of China.

Matsuda played at the 2007 BWF World Championships in men's doubles with Tadashi Ohtsuka, and were defeated in the third round by the eventual champions Markis Kido and Hendra Setiawan, of Indonesia, 22–20, 21–19. He also played in mixed doubles with Miyuki Maeda and they lost in the second round against He Hanbin and Yu Yang, 21–17, 21–18.

References

External links
 

1979 births
Living people
People from Kanazawa, Ishikawa
Sportspeople from Ishikawa Prefecture
Japanese male badminton players
Olympic badminton players of Japan
Badminton players at the 2000 Summer Olympics
Badminton players at the 2004 Summer Olympics
Badminton players at the 2008 Summer Olympics
Badminton players at the 2006 Asian Games
Badminton players at the 2002 Asian Games
Asian Games competitors for Japan
21st-century Japanese people